Nissanka Manodha Wijeyeratne (Sinhala: නිශ්ශංක මනෝද විජයරත්න) (28 July 1957 – 29 October 2011) (known as Mano Wijeyeratne) was a former Politician, Government Minister, Coordinating Secretary to the President, Chairman of Road Accidents Prevention Authority  , Member of United National Party and Sri Lanka Freedom Party chief organiser for the Dedigama Electorate in Kegalle District he was former Member of Parliament from Kegalle District.

Wijeyeratne had also served as Non-Cabinet Minister of Enterprise Development in President Mahinda Rajapakse's Government and Minister of Plantation Services under President D B Wijetunga's Government.

Early life

Born to a political dynasty in Sri Lanka, he was the second son of Dr Nissanka Wijeyeratne & Nita Dullewe Wijeyeratne and he had three brothers and a sister. They are Neranjan, Anuradha, Lankesh & Nishangani. Mano Wijeyeratne's father Nissanka and grandfather, Sir Edwin Wijeyeratne were prominent politicians who had become cabinet ministers. He was educated at the Royal College, Colombo.

Political career
Mano Wijeyeratne served as Member of Parliament for 17 years and had been elected to the parliament from Kegalle District four times from the United National Party in the years 1989, 1994, 2000 and 2004.He was a member of the United National party from 1989 to 2007 before crossingover to the Sri Lanka Freedom Party (2007-till his death). He was a former District Leader of Kegalle District for the United National Party (2004-2007).
He had also served as Non-Cabinet Minister of Enterprise Development and Plantation Services. At the time of his death he was serving as the Sri Lanka Freedom Party chief organiser for the Dedigama Electorate.

Family
He was first married to Dushyanthi Wegodapola Daughter of Colonel Stanley Wegodapola (ex ADC to President of Sri Lanka) and Mrs Prema Wegodapola of Ratwatte Walauwa, Ukuwela. Mano Wijeyeratne had three children, eldest son Professor Subodhana Wijeyeratne 
(BA & MA from University of Cambridge, UK. & PhD from 
Harvard University, Massachusetts, USA)
current he is a Professor at Purdue University, Lafayette, Indiana, USA., Varanusha (died at an early age), and Hasitha (a BSc graduate in Diagnostic Radiography from the University of Hertfordshire, UK). His second spouse was Bharathi Wijeratne.

See also
List of political families in Sri Lanka

References

External links

  The Wijeyeratne Ancestry
  Ratwatte Family Tree
 Right Royal rally of old Royalists in the Sri Lanka Parliament

1957 births
2011 deaths
Sri Lankan Buddhists
Mano
Alumni of Royal College, Colombo
Sinhalese politicians
Government ministers of Sri Lanka
Members of the 9th Parliament of Sri Lanka
Members of the 10th Parliament of Sri Lanka
Members of the 11th Parliament of Sri Lanka
Members of the 13th Parliament of Sri Lanka